The 1892 Maryville Scots football team represented the Maryville College during the 1892 college football season. In its inaugural season, the team's head coach was the Japanese Kin Takahashi.

Schedule

References

Maryville
Maryville Scots football seasons
College football winless seasons
Maryville Scots football